Werkendam is a town and a former municipality in the southern Netherlands. The municipality, part of Land van Heusden en Altena, contained a large part of De Biesbosch area as is located in the province of North Brabant. On January 1sth 2019 it joined Woudrichem and Aalburg in the new municipality of Altena.

Population centres 
Dussen
Hank
Nieuwendijk
Sleeuwijk
't Zand
Werkendam

Topography

Dutch Topographic map of the municipality of Werkendam, 2013.

Transport 

Public transport is by Veolia neighborhood bus to Gorinchem through Sleeuwijk Tol, and by ferry to Boven-Hardinxveld. The bus between Utrecht and Breda, and the bus between Gorinchem and Den Bosch goes through Sleeuwijk Tol.

For road traffic to Dordrecht there is a ferry to cross the Nieuwe Merwede river.

Notable people 
 Gijsbert van Tienhoven (1841 in De Werken – 1914), Prime Minister of the Netherlands 1891–1894 
 Anton Mussert (1894 in Werkendam – 1946), one of the founders of the National Socialist Movement in the Netherlands (NSB) and its formal leader (executed)
 Cornelis Pieter van den Hoek (1921 in Leerdam – 2015 in Werkendam), resistance fighter (line-crosser), lived in Werkendam
 Adri van Heteren (born 1951 in Gouda), SGP party chair and Christian minister (in Werkendam)
 Rebekka Kadijk (born 1979 in Werkendam), professional beach volleyball and indoor volleyball player, competed in the 2000 and 2004 Summer Olympics

References

External links 
 
  Official website

Geography of Altena, North Brabant
Land van Heusden en Altena
Former municipalities of North Brabant
Populated places in North Brabant
Municipalities of the Netherlands disestablished in 2019